The mountain tailorbird (Phyllergates cucullatus) is a songbird species formerly placed in the "Old World warbler" assemblage, but is now placed in the genus Phyllergates of the family Cettiidae.

It is found in Bangladesh, Bhutan, Cambodia, China, India, Indonesia, Laos, Malaysia, Myanmar, the Philippines, Thailand, and Vietnam. Its natural habitats are subtropical or tropical moist lowland forest and subtropical or tropical moist montane forest.

References

mountain tailorbird
Birds of Bhutan
Birds of Northeast India
Birds of South China
Birds of Southeast Asia
mountain tailorbird
Taxonomy articles created by Polbot
Birds of Bangladesh